The New Zealand bellbird (Anthornis melanura), also known by its Māori names korimako, makomako, and kōmako, is a passerine bird endemic to New Zealand. It has greenish colouration and is the only living member of the genus Anthornis. The bellbird forms a significant component of the famed New Zealand dawn chorus of bird song that was much noted by early European settlers. The explorer Captain Cook wrote of its song "it seemed to be like small bells most exquisitely tuned". The species is common across much of New Zealand and its offshore islands as well as the Auckland Islands.

Description
Males are olive-green with a dark purplish sheen on their head and black outer wing and tail, while females are a duller olive-brown with a blue sheen on the head and yellowish-white curving from the base of the bill to below the eye. Both have a notably red eye. They are about 17–20 cm from the tip of their beak to the end of their tail. Females weigh about 25 g and males 32 g. Juvenile females have brown eyes and a light yellow cheek stripe.  Juvenile males have dull brown-black outer wing and tail feathers.

Classification
There are four subspecies: A. melanura melanura, A. melanura dumerii, A. melanura oneho, and A. melanura obscura. The Chatham bellbird, A. melanocephala, which became extinct in the early 20th century, was formerly classified as a subspecies of the New Zealand bellbird, as A. melanura melanocephala.

Distribution

The bellbird is found throughout both the main islands of New Zealand apart from the north of the North Island. Its population and distribution had been seriously affected by the introduction of European-style farming, which has led to the removal of native forests (the natural habitat of the bellbird). Another important factor is the introduction of predatory species such as cats, weasels, stoats, ferrets, rats, and food-robbing species like wasps. Predators either eat the birds or consume eggs, while food robbers compete with the bellbird for its natural food sources of nectar, honeydew and insects. The initial decline after European colonisation in the North Island was very marked and before farming was well established in many areas affected so other factors such as infection may have played a role. Indeed there are complexities as to assigning predator blame and the remarkable re-population over 100 years creates some issues too. Despite South Island colonisation in the same time frame the die back was not as severe. Descriptions exist of massive die back in the North Island within less than a 3 year period commencing within 10 years of colonisation in the 1850s and by the 1880s the species was feared close to extinction being confined to off shore islands and lake islands such as Motutaiko Island in Lake Taupō where the only likely predator was the Polynesian rat. On the largest island, Manawatāwhi of the Three Kings group to the north of the North Island, it was the only species of bird to remain plentiful, when the vegetation cover was impoverished because of the presence of goats. On Great Barrier Island, it disappeared in a 10 year period but remained on the smaller islands of the Hauraki Gulf, which possibly allowed more rapid recolonisation of the Auckland mainland in due course. Accordingly the decline occurred around the same time as that of many other New Zealand species, but for unknown reasons was reversed and the species is still common across much of New Zealand.

Behaviour

Breeding
Breeding occurs from September to January where two broods can be produced. Their nesting habits are similar to the tui in respect to colour of eggs, clutch size and incubation. They generally lay three to four eggs with pinkish brown spots and blotches.

Diet
Bellbirds feed on nectar, fruit and insects. Insects are important for females and their chicks during the breeding season. As honeyeaters, with brush-tipped tongues that enable them to sip nectar and the honeydew found on the trunks of beech trees, they play an important part in pollinating numerous native plants such as mistletoe, fuchsia, and kowhai.

Song

Bellbird song consists of three distinct sounds similar to the sound of chiming bells. They sing during the day but more in the early morning and late evening. Their alarm call is a repeated set of harsh staccato notes, similar to a blackbird. The call of the Anthornis melanura is used by Radio New Zealand as an interval signal.

References

Further reading

External links

 Holotype of Poor Knights bellbird Anthornis melanura oneho from the collection of the Museum of New Zealand Te Papa Tongarewa
 Specimens of New Zealand bellbird Anthornis melanura melanura from the collection of the Museum of New Zealand Te Papa Tongarewa
 Artist's depiction of Chatham Island bellbird Anthornis melanocephala Chatham Island Bellbird / Komako. by Paul Martinson. Artwork produced for the book Extinct Birds of New Zealand, by Alan Tennyson, Te Papa Press, Wellington, 2006

Meliphagidae
Endemic birds of New Zealand
Birds described in 1786
Fauna of the Auckland Islands
Taxa named by Anders Sparrman